Ana Maria Tănasie (born 6 April 1995) is a Romanian handballer who plays for Minaur Baia Mare.

She was given the award of Cetățean de onoare ("Honorary Citizen") of her hometown Hunedoara in 2015.

Achievements
Liga Naţională:
Winner: 2014
Silver Medalist: 2016
Cupa României:
Winner: 2013, 2014
Supercupa României:
Winner: 2013, 2015
World Championship: 
Bronze Medalist: 2015

Awards and recognition
 Handball-Planet.com Young World Left Wing of the Season: 2016

References

 
 

1995 births
Living people
Sportspeople from Hunedoara
Romanian female handball players
CS Minaur Baia Mare (women's handball) players